The green and red venter harlequin toad (Atelopus pinangoi) is a species of toad in the family Bufonidae.
It is endemic to Venezuela.
Its natural habitats are subtropical or tropical moist montane forests, rivers, and intermittent rivers.
It is threatened by habitat loss.

References

Sources
 

Atelopus
Amphibians of the Andes
Endemic fauna of Venezuela
Amphibians described in 1982
Taxonomy articles created by Polbot